Horák (feminine Horáková) is a Czech and Slovak family name, and may refer to:
Hana Horáková (born 1979) Czech basketball player
Jiří Horák (1924–2003) Czech democrat
Josef Horák, (1931–2005) Czech bass clarinetist.
Martin Horák, Czech footballer
Milada Horáková (1901–1950), Czech politician executed by communists
Oldřich Horák, Czech ice hockey player
Peter Horák (born 1983), Slovakian higher jumper
Petr Horák (born 1991), Czech snowboarder
Robert Horák (born 1982), Czech ice hockey player
Roman Horák (ice hockey, born 1969), Czech ice hockey player
Roman Horák (ice hockey, born 1991), Czech ice hockey player
Václav Horák, Czech footballer
Václav Emanuel Horák (1800–1871), Czech composer

Horak
Marianne Horak (born 1944), entomologist.
Michael Horak (born 1977), South African rugby player
Olga Horak (born 1926) Slovak-born Australian author and Holocaust survivor.
Yaroslav Horak (born 1927), comics artist for the Daily Express
Walter Horak (1931–2019), Austrian footballer

Czech-language surnames